The Nicaraguan Navy, officially the Naval Force of the Nicaraguan Army, is the naval service branch of the Nicaraguan Armed Forces. The navy's mission is to ensure the defense and security of the islands, territorial waters and exclusive economic zone of Nicaragua in the Pacific Ocean and Caribbean Sea.

Founded on August 13, 1980 as the Sandinista Navy, it consisted of a few old patrol boats in the early 1980s. The Sandinistas acquired eight Soviet Yevgenya class minesweepers, of which seven remained in 1993. Three Soviet Zhuk-class patrol boats were believed to be seaworthy, out of seven that remained at the end of 1990. Also believed to be operational are three North Korean fast patrol boats as well as two Vedette-type boats built in France and armed with Soviet 14.5mm machine guns.

The primary mission was to discourage seaborne Contra attacks and to deter CIA-run operations such as the destruction of diesel storage facilities at Corinto in 1983 and the mining of Nicaraguan harbors in 1984. The Sandinista navy (—MGS), which had reached a peak strength of 3,000 personnel in 1990, suffered a sweeping reduction to 800 by 1993.

The commander of the navy was a Sandinista Popular Army (—EPS) officer with the rank of major. The principal bases of the MGS are at the ports of Corinto on the Pacific and Puerto Cabezas on the Caribbean. Other installations are at El Bluff near Bluefields and San Juan del Sur on the Pacific.

Nicaragua ordered two additional patrol vessels based on the Damen Stan 4207 design in 2017.  The vessels were commissioned as Soberanía I (409) and Soberanía II (411) in August 2019. Unlike many other nations vessels, which are designed solely for coast guard or environmental monitoring, these two have added a military sensor suite and a deck gun.  Militarizing the vessels boosted their cost from $20 million USD to $65 million USD.  The vessels are used, had previously been employed by Jamaica - HMJS Cornwall and HMJS Surrey.

Fleet

References

Military of Nicaragua
Navies by country